Adler Bruno Sá Nogueira de Nascimento (born 25 November 2004) is a Portuguese professional footballer who plays as a forward for Premier League club Crystal Palace.

Nascimento progressed through the youth ranks of Peterborough United and made his senior debut in May 2021. Shortly after, he joined Crystal Palace on a scholarship with a pre-contract agreement. He signed a professional contract in January 2022.

Career
Nascimento is a product of the Peterborough United academy, having joined in 2014. Aged 15, Nascimento moved up to the under-18s and was noted for his goalscoring abilities, which included two goals in a 7–2 FA Youth Cup win against Newmarket Town and a hat-trick in a 5–0 win against Leyton Orient. In February 2021, he helped the under-18s win the EFL Youth Alliance League for a second successive season.

In February 2021, Nascimento joined the first team squad travelling to Gillingham. On 9 May 2021, he made his senior debut in the final match of the season. He replaced Frankie Kent for the last 16 minutes of a 4–1 win against Doncaster Rovers.

On 17 July 2021, Nascimento announced his exit from Peterborough United on social media. He subsequently joined Premier League club Crystal Palace for an expected £500,000 compensation fee. Director of Football Barry Fry revealed that 12 Premier League clubs had enquired for the forward, with six official bids. He signed a professional contract with Palace in January 2022.

Personal life
Born in Portugal, Nascimento is of Bissau-Guinean descent. He moved to England at a young age.

Career statistics

References

External links

2004 births
Living people
Portuguese footballers
Portuguese people of Bissau-Guinean descent
Portuguese emigrants to England
Association football forwards
Peterborough United F.C. players
Crystal Palace F.C. players
English Football League players